Matthew Marinelli (born March 20, 1985), known by his ring name, Matt Taven, is an American professional wrestler and wrestling trainer, who currently wrestles for All Elite Wrestling. 

He is best known for his work with Ring of Honor (ROH), where he won the Ring of Honor World Championship in Madison Square Garden in 2019 and Impact Wrestling where he is a former member of Honor No More. He also appears for Consejo Mundial de Lucha Libre (CMLL), where he is a former NWA World Historic Welterweight Champion.

Taven's Ring of Honor work includes being a member of The Kingdom (with Adam Cole, Michael Bennett, Maria Kanellis, Vinny Marseglia, and T. K. O'Ryan at various times) as well as performing across the Northeastern United States independent circuit. Taven won ROH's 2013 Top Prospect Tournament to become a full-time wrestler for the promotion. He is a former one-time ROH World Champion, one-time World Television Champion, one-time ROH World Tag Team Champion with Michael Bennett, and one-third of the first ROH World Six-Man Tag Team Champions. Taven has also worked for the Japanese promotion New Japan Pro-Wrestling (NJPW), where he is a former one-time IWGP Tag Team Champion with Bennett. Taven is the second wrestler to win championships in ROH, CMLL, and NJPW, the other being Rocky Romero.

Taven and Bennett have operated a wrestling school in West Warwick, Rhode Island, since 2016.

Professional wrestling career
Marinelli, using the ring name Matt Taven, made his professional wrestling debut on March 7, 2008. During his first year, Taven worked mainly for Top Rope Promotions (TRP) and Collision Pro Wrestling (CPW) in Massachusetts. While working for TRP he challenged for the vacant TRP Interstate Championship in a six-way ladder match that also included Buck Nasty, Gregory Edwards, J. Freddie, Ryan Waters, and Spike Dudley, but lost to Buck Nasty.

Ring of Honor (2009–2021)

Debut and ROH Television Champion (2009–2014) 

Taven's first match for Ring of Honor (ROH) was on May 8, 2009, where he lost to Jaleel Patel in a bout that took place before cameras began recording the remaining show for television. Taven competed in tag team matches over the course of 2010 and 2011, but lost every outing. At ROH's Boiling Point show on August 11, 2012, Taven lost a four-way match, where the winner would receive an ROH contract. He would go on to win the 2013 Top Prospect Tournament the following year, with the storyline reward being that Taven would earn a full-time ROH contract. With that win, Taven also earned a ROH World Television Championship match against Adam Cole. Taven went on to defeat Cole to win the television championship at the 11th Anniversary Show. During the match he established himself as a heel after Truth Martini hit Cole in the back of the head with the Book of Truth, allowing Taven to apply his Climax finishing move to pick up the win. On April 5, at Supercard of Honor VII, he successfully defended the title against Adam Cole and Matt Hardy.

On April 6, he would successfully defend the title against A. C. H. At Border Wars 2013 he would successfully defend the title against Mark Briscoe. On June 22 at Best in the World 2013, Taven successfully defended the ROH World Television Championship against Jimmy Jacobs and Jay Lethal in a three-way match. On August 3 at All Star Extravaganza 5, he faced Roderick Strong in a losing effort in the first round of the tournament to determine the new a champion after the ROH World Championship was vacated. On September 20, 2013 at Death Before Dishonor XI, Taven, Michael Bennett and reDRagon (Bobby Fish and Kyle O'Reilly) lost to the team of Adrenaline Rush (ACH and TaDarius Thomas) and C&C Wrestle Factory (Caprice Coleman and Cedric Alexander) On September 21 he successfully defended the title against Jay Lethal. On October 26 at Glory by Honor XII, he teamed with reDRagon and Adam Cole in an Eight-man elimination tag team match where he was eliminated by Michael Elgin.

On November 15 at Pursuit Night, he retained the title against Zach Gowen. On December 14 at Final Battle 2013, Taven lost the ROH World Television Championship to Tommaso Ciampa. Matt Taven's reign as World Television Champion was the longest in the company's history to date at 287 days and he accrued the most title defenses, 12, in an individual reign. Taven fired Truth Martini at ROH's Wrestling's Finest show. Later that night he unsuccessfully challenged Tommaso Ciampa for the ROH World Television Championship in a three-way match that also included Jay Lethal. At the 12th Anniversary Show, he defeated Silas Young. On March 7, 2014, at Raising The Bar Day 1, he unsuccessfully challenged Adam Cole for the ROH World Championship.

Teaming with Michael Bennett (2014–2015) 
Taven then entered a feud with Jay Lethal, unsuccessfully challenging him for the ROH World Television Championship on three different occasions. The first was at Global Wars in a four corner survival match that also included Tommaso Ciampa and Silas Young. At War of the Worlds he teamed with ACH and Tommaso Ciampa to defeat Forever Hooligans (Alex Koslov and Rocky Romero) and Takaaki Watanabe. The second was at Best in the World in a singles match. The last was at Field of Honor on August 15, where he was defeated by Lethal in a steel cage match after interference by Truth Martini. On August 19, 2014, Taven announced he had decided not to re-sign with ROH and would be leaving the promotion. This was an angle used to explain why Taven left the company. Taven returned to Ring of Honor in October.

In November 2014, Taven began teaming with Michael Bennett, collectively known as the Kingdom. On November 15 at Glory By Honor XIII, they were defeated by reDRagon for the ROH World Tag Team Championship. Almost one year later, on September 18, 2015, they won the title at All Star Extravaganza VII, when they defeated The Addiction (Christopher Daniels and Frankie Kazarian) and The Young Bucks (Matt and Nick Jackson) in a three-way match. They lost the title to War Machine (Hanson and Ray Rowe) on December 18 at Final Battle.

The Kingdom and World Championship pursuits (2016–2021) 
Taven suffered a knee injury during the December 18 match at Final Battle, tearing an anterior cruciate ligament and medial meniscus and rupturing a lateral meniscus, which forced him to undergo a four-and-a-half-hour surgery on January 12, 2016. He was expected to be sidelined for nine months. During his injury, Bennett left ROH and, when Taven made his return in September 2016, he was put in a new version of The Kingdom as the leader, with T. K. O'Ryan and Vinny Marseglia as his new partners. The Kingdom won a tournament to become the first ROH 6-Man Tag Team Champions, defeating Jay White, Kushida and Lio Rush at the Final Battle 2016 PPV. They lost the title to Bully Ray and The Briscoes on March 11, 2017 in a match where Silas Young replaced an injured T. K. O'Ryan.

On May 10, 2017 during the second night of ROH/NJPW War Of The Worlds, Taven was unsuccessful at winning the ROH World Championship against Christopher Daniels. At Final Battle 2017, Taven defeated Will Ospreay. In January 2018, Taven started a rivalry with Cody Rhodes, attacking him and stealing his "Ring Of Honor". On the ROH 16th Anniversary Show, Taven was defeated by Cody. On May 9, 2018, at ROH/NJPW War of the Worlds Tour, The Kingdom would regain the ROH World Six-Man Tag Team Championship by defeating SoCal Uncensored. During a match for the ROH World Championship, Taven achieved a three count in the match, however the referee was not looking and the match ended with Jay Lethal winning the title. The Kingdom would lose the titles to Bullet Club, later known as The Elite (Cody and the Young Bucks).

At ROH's Death Before Dishonor The Kingdom attacked Will Ospreay and Jay Lethal. After the assault, Taven pulled out of a bag a copy of the Ring Of Honor World Championship which was purple instead of black leather, saying he is the true Ring Of Honor World Champion. On November 2, 2018, The Kingdom would win the ROH World Six-Man Tag Team Championship for the third time, beating The Elite, holding them until March 16, 2019. On March 15, 2019, at the ROH 17th Anniversary Show, Taven challenge Lethal for the Ring of Honor World Championship, with the match ending in a 60-minute time-limit draw. The following month at G1 Supercard, Taven would defeat Lethal and Marty Scurll in a ladder match to win the ROH World Title, and with that becoming the second ROH Grand Slam winner. His title win over the more popular Marty Scurll has been criticized, usually calling him a "critical and financial flop". During a 411Mania podcast, Jerome Cusson said his title win "actively hurt ROH" since it was not "a draw" and he "wasn't over". On September 27, 2019, at Death Before Dishonor, Matt Taven was defeated by Rush for the ROH Championship, ending his reign at 174 days. On ROH television Vinny Marseglia turned and attacked Matt Taven. On December 13, 2019, at Final Battle, Marseglia defeated Taven.

New Japan Pro-Wrestling (2014–2015, 2019)

Through ROH's relationship with NJPW, from November 23 to December 5, 2014, Taven and Michael Bennett took part in New Japan Pro-Wrestling (NJPW)'s 2014 World Tag League. The team finished their round-robin block with a record of four wins and three losses, failing to advance to the finals. Taven and Bennett returned to NJPW on April 5, 2015, at Invasion Attack 2015, where they defeated Bullet Club (Doc Gallows and Karl Anderson) to win the IWGP Tag Team Championship. On July 5 at Dominion 7.5 in Osaka-jo Hall, The Kingdom lost the IWGP Tag Team Championship back to Bullet Club in their first defense. Taven and Bennett returned to NJPW in November to take part in the 2015 World Tag League, where they finished with a record of two wins and four losses, failing to advance from their block. Taven returned to Japan in 2019, teaming with Vinny Marseglia for the ROH/NJPW co-promoted "Honor Rising" tour, which ended with a loss to Los Ingobernables de Japón (Shingo Takagi and Tetsuya Naito).

Consejo Mundial de Lucha Libre (2016–2019)
Through ROH's working relationship with Consejo Mundial de Lucha Libre (CMLL), Taven made his debut for the Mexican promotion on September 9, 2016, which also marked his return from a nine-month absence due to a knee injury. On September 13, Taven was defeated by Rush in Arena México in the last CMLL match of the 2016 tour. Taven returned to CMLL on March 17, 2017, unsuccessfully challenging Último Guerrero for the NWA World Historic Middleweight Championship at that year's Homenaje a Dos Leyendas show. He returned to Mexico later in 2017, participating in the International Gran Prix as part of "Team International". Taven was eliminated by Rush near the end of the tournament. Taven returned to CMLL on March 16, 2018, participating in that year's Homenaje a Dos Leyendas show, where he, Atlantis, and Niebla Roja defeated Los Guerreros Laguneros (Euforia, Gran Guerrero, and Último Guerrero).

On March 30, 2018, Taven defeated Volador Jr. to win the NWA World Historic Welterweight Championship. He returned to Mexico in August of that year, starting out by losing the NWA World Historic Welterweight Championship back to Volador Jr. at the Negro Casas 40th Anniversary Show. Afterwards Taven and Volador Jr. joined forces they were both attacked by Los Ingobernables ("The Unruly"; the team of Rush and El Terrible). The storyline with Los Ingobernables built over the following month, with Bárbaro Cavernario replacing El Terrible due to an injury, to the main event of the CMLL 85th Anniversary Show. Rush and Cavernario defeated Taven and Volador Jr. on a Lucha de Apuesta ("Bet match"). As part of the storyline, Taven turned on Volador Jr., costing their team the match. After the match both Taven and Volador Jr. had their hair shaved off as a result. Taven, now bald, returned to CMLL for the 2018 International Gran Prix tournament. During the match, Volador Jr. took revenge on Taven for costing them their match and pinned Taven 45 minutes into the match. Taven returned to Mexico and CMLL once more in August 2019, this time as ROH World Heavyweight Champion, for the 2019 International Gran Prix tournament. For the second year in the row Volador Jr. pinned Taven to eliminate him.

Impact Wrestling (2022) 

At Hard To Kill, on January 8, 2022, Taven made his Impact Wrestling debut, appeared along with Maria, Mike Bennett, PCO, and Vincent, attacking Eddie Edwards, Rich Swann, Willie Mack, Heath and Rhino. The group is known as Honor No More. On September 1, 2022 episode of Impact!, they defeated The Good Brothers (Doc Gallows and Karl Anderson) to capture the Impact World Tag Team Championship for a first time. They would lose the titles on the October 20, 2022 edition of Impact! to Heath and Rhino.

On October 8, 2022, it was announced that Taven, Bennett, Kanellis, and Vincent had left Impact Wrestling.

All Elite Wrestling (2022-Present)
Taven made his All Elite Wrestling debut on the October 14, 2022 episode of Rampage, alongside Mike Bennett and Maria Kanellis interrupting FTR and Shawn Spears' victory celebration. On the October 28, 2022 episode of Rampage Taven unsuccessfully challenged the AEW TNT Champion Wardlow.

Championships and accomplishments

 Chaotic Wrestling
 Chaotic Wrestling New England Championship (2 times)
 Chaotic Wrestling Tag Team Championship (1 time) – with Vinny Marseglia
Chaotic Wrestling New England Championship Tournament
Consejo Mundial de Lucha Libre
NWA World Historic Welterweight Championship (1 time)
 Impact Championship Wrestling
 ICW Tag Team Championship (1 time) – with Rhett Titus
Impact Wrestling
 Impact World Tag Team Championship (1 time) – with Mike Bennett
 National Wrestling Alliance
 NWA On Fire Tag Team Championship (1 time) – with Julian Starr
 New Japan Pro-Wrestling
 IWGP Tag Team Championship (1 time) – with Michael Bennett
 Northeast Wrestling
 NEW Heavyweight Championship (2 times)
 Pro Wrestling Experience
 Robbie Ellis Tournament of Super Juniors
 Pro Wrestling Illustrated
 Ranked No. 37 of the top 500 singles wrestlers in the PWI 500 in 2019
 Ring of Honor 
 ROH World Championship (1 time)
 ROH World Television Championship (1 time)
 ROH World Tag Team Championship (2 times) – with Michael/Mike Bennett
 ROH World Six-Man Tag Team Championship (3 times) – with T. K. O'Ryan and Vinny Marseglia
 Top Prospect Tournament (2013)
 ROH World Six-Man Tag Team Championship Tournament (2016) – with T. K. O'Ryan and Vinny Marseglia 
 Fifth Triple Crown Champion
 Second Grand Slam Champion
 ROH Year-End Award (2 times)
 Match of the Year (2019) 
 Wrestler of the Year (2019)
The Wrestling Revolver
PWR Tag Team Championship (1 time) - with Mike Bennett
 Top Rope Promotions
 TRP Heavyweight Championship (2 times)
Killer Kowalski Cup (2010)

Luchas de Apuestas record

References

External links

 
 
 Chaotic Wrestling profile

1985 births
21st-century professional wrestlers
American male professional wrestlers
Living people
People from Derry, New Hampshire
Professional wrestlers from New Hampshire
Professional wrestling trainers
ROH World Champions
ROH World Television Champions
ROH World Tag Team Champions
ROH World Six-Man Tag Team Champions
TNA/Impact World Tag Team Champions
IWGP Heavyweight Tag Team Champions
NWA World Historic Welterweight Champions
All Elite Wrestling personnel